Joseph-Théophile-Adélard Fontaine (30 November 1892 – 21 November 1967) was a Canadian lawyer and politician. Fontaine was a Liberal party member of the House of Commons of Canada. He was born in Saint-Thomas-d'Aquin, Quebec and became a lawyer by career.

Fontaine attended seminary at Saint-Hyacinthe then Université Laval and attained B.A. and LL.L degrees. In 1929, he was appointed King's Counsel.

He was first elected to Parliament at the St. Hyacinthe—Rouville riding in the 1930 general election then re-elected there in 1935 and 1940. Fontaine resigned on 27 July 1944 before completing his term in the 19th Canadian Parliament.

Named in 1944 as judge to the Court of Sessions of the Peace (now the Criminal and Penal Division of the Court of Quebec), he died on 21 November 1967, after 23 years on the bench.

References

External links
 

1892 births
1967 deaths
Canadian King's Counsel
Lawyers in Quebec
Liberal Party of Canada MPs
Members of the House of Commons of Canada from Quebec
People from Saint-Hyacinthe